Dispatch is an unincorporated community in Smith County, Kansas, United States.

History
A post office was opened in Dispatch in 1891, and remained in operation until it was discontinued in 1904. Dispatch was named after its role in shipping the mail.

References

Further reading

External links
 Smith County maps: Current, Historic, KDOT

Unincorporated communities in Smith County, Kansas
Unincorporated communities in Kansas